Affliction is a 2021 Indonesian horror film directed and written by Teddy Soeriaatmadja and starring Raihaanun Soeriaatmadja, Tutie Kirana and Ibnu Jamil. In the film, a wife slowly learns the horrifying truth of her husband after visiting his dying mother's house in a rural Central Java village.

Plot 
Further encouraged due to a strained relationship with his mother Dayu, Hasan left his rural Central Java home to pursue a career as a psychologist in Jakarta. He has a wife, Nina; and two children, Tasha and Ryan. Nina had just lost his mother from illness, but believes she decapitated herself with a knife. Dayu's caretaker informs Nina that Dayu's dementia is worsening supernaturally. Upon Nina's request, who fear that her mother's fate would be that of Dayu's, Hasan reluctantly brings the entire family there to take Dayu to Jakarta. However Dayu rejects, and Hasan leaves his family temporarily on work grounds. Paranormal activities, such as Dayu alleged to hearing someone say "Ari Kibar" and a shadow standing randomly, occur. Dayu also attempts to slice herself. One day, she drinks a ginger tea Nina made and inexplicably dies.

One day, Nina sees the caretaker going somewhere. She follows her, who enters a remote house, meaning she is not a real caretaker. Inside, Nina sees news clippings revealing that Hasan had a friend named Dimas. Furthermore, she learns that "Ari Kibar" means "Arah kiblat" ('Qibla heading'); in Dayu's home, the heading faces a tree, and buried in it are human bones. Upon return, Hasan reveals that he and Dimas used to obsess on impressing Dayu with their skills. Amid a fight, he kills him with a knife. Dayu secrets this from Dimas' family. Raging, Nina brings her children to flee without Hasan, who then has an epiphany to kill Nina. While Nina is packing, he strangles her, but she is saved by a neighbor related to Dimas who eavesdropped the confession, killing Hasan with a spade. He and Dimas are properly buried by dawn.

Cast 
 Raihaanun Soeriaatmadja as Nina
 Tutie Kirana as Hasan's mother
 Ibnu Jamil as Hasan
 Abiyyu Barakbah as Ryan
 Tasya Putri as Tasya
 Dea Panendra as Narsih
 Hetty Reksoprodjo as Oma
 Ernanta Kusuma Panca as Ustad Dirman
 Fajrul Ravi as Dimas Rangga
 Abirama Putra A. as young Hasan

Release
Netflix acquired the distribution rights to Affliction, releasing it on its streaming service on 21 January 2021.

References

External links 
 
 

2021 films
Indonesian horror films
2020s Indonesian-language films
Indonesian-language Netflix original films